Joan Marcia Bathurst (née Hartigan; 6 June 1912 – 31 August 2000) was an Australian Champion tennis player.

Early life and education
Joan Marcia Hartigan was born in Sydney, the daughter of Thomas Joseph (Tom) Hartigan, a railways commissioner, and Imelda Josephine, née Boylson, a schoolteacher; the couple wed on 26 March 1908 at St Thomas's Catholic Church, Lewisham, New South Wales. Tom Hartigan was a clerk in the New South Wales Government Railways and eventually became Railways Commissioner. Joan was educated at the all-girls' Loreto Kirribilli, in the lower north shore of Sydney.

Tennis career
Bathurst won the singles title at the Australian Championships three times and was a semifinalist at Wimbledon in 1934 (losing to Helen Jacobs) and 1935 (losing to Helen Wills Moody). Bathurst three times reached the women's doubles final at the Australian Championships, in 1933, 1934, and 1940. Bathurst teamed with Edgar Moon to win the mixed doubles title at the 1934 Australian Championships. According to A. Wallis Myers of The Daily Telegraph and the Daily Mail, Bathurst was ranked in the world top 10 in 1934 and 1935, reaching a career high of world no. 8 in these rankings in 1934.

Grand Slam finals

Singles (3 titles)

Personal and family life
In January, 1943 she enlisted in the Australian Army; she was discharged on 1 September 1943. In 1946, she announced her engagement to Hugh Moxon Bathurst of Melbourne who was then private secretary to Senator James Fraser, Chifley's Health minister. They married at St Mary's Cathedral, Sydney on Saturday, 12 April 1947, before flying to Adelaide then Perth to board the Orion at Fremantle for England where they planned to live for a few years while she resumed her tennis career at Wimbledon. In 1950, they returned on the Strathmore after living in Surrey for three years and settled in Sydney. Joan Bathurst died on 31 August 2000, and her husband died 16 April 2001. Their son, Thomas Frederick Bathurst became Chief Justice of New South Wales.

Grand Slam singles tournament timeline

1In 1946 and 1947, the French Championships were held after Wimbledon.

See also 
 Performance timelines for all female tennis players who reached at least one Grand Slam final

References

External links

 Joan Hartigan at The Australian Women's Register
 Joan Hartigan Bathurst at Mosman Hall of Sporting Fame
 

1912 births
2000 deaths
Australian Championships (tennis) champions
Australian female tennis players
Sportswomen from New South Wales
Grand Slam (tennis) champions in women's singles
Grand Slam (tennis) champions in mixed doubles
Grand Slam (tennis) champions in girls' singles
Tennis players from Sydney
Australian Championships (tennis) junior champions
20th-century Australian women
Australian Army personnel of World War II
Military personnel from New South Wales